Küçük Kaymaklı Türk S.K is a Turkish Cypriot sports club based in North Nicosia. It was established in 1951. They are also known as “Forest Kaymaklı”

Colors
The club colours are black and green.

Stadium
The club's home stadium is Lefkoşa Şehit Hüseyin Ruso Stadyumu.

Achievements
Birinci Lig: (4)
 1962-63, 1984-85, 1985-86, 2010-11
Kıbrıs Kupası and Federasyon Kupası: (7)
 1980, 1986, 1988, 1997, 2002, 2004, 2016
Runners-up (6): 1963, 1982, 1991, 2001, 2009, 2012
Cumhurbaşkanlığı Kupası: (1)
 1997
Runners-up (3): 1985, 1986, 1998, 2011
Dr. Fazıl Küçük Kupası: (2)
 1997, 2001
Runners-up (1): 1998
Başbakanlık Kupası: (2)
 1998, 2001
Runners-up (2): 1991, 1999

Notable players

  Patrick Villars
  Geofrey Massa
  Ousmane Keita
 Nigeria Obada Felix

References

External links
  Forest fan site
  Pictures of the club Stadium

Association football clubs established in 1951
Football clubs in Nicosia
Football clubs in Northern Cyprus
1951 establishments in Cyprus